The teams competing in Group 4 of the 2004 UEFA European Under-21 Championships qualifying competition were Sweden, Poland, Hungary, Latvia and San Marino.

Standings

* Match originally ended as a 6–0 victory for Sweden, but UEFA later awarded the match as a 3–0 forfeit win to San Marino due to Sweden including suspended players in their squad.

Matches
All times are CET.

Match originally ended as a 6–0 victory for Sweden, but UEFA later awarded the match as a 3–0 forfeit win to San Marino due to Sweden including suspended players in their squad.

Goalscorers
4 goals

 Imre Szabics
 Aleksejs Kolesnikovs
 Sebastian Olszar
 Johan Elmander

3 goals

 Michał Goliński
 Bartosz Ślusarski
 Arash Talebinejad

2 goals

 Boldizsár Bodor
 Ákos Buzsáky
 Péter Czvitkovics
 Norbert Németh
 Sándor Torghelle
 Gatis Kalniņš
 Jurģis Kalns
 Ģirts Karlsons
 Rafał Grzelak
 Sebastian Mila
 Patryk Rachwał
 Nicola Ciacci
 Alexander Renzi
 Johan Andersson
 Alexander Farnerud

1 goal

 Péter Bajzát
 Béla Koplárovics
 Balázs Tóth
 Andrejs Butriks
 Piotr Brożek
 Łukasz Madej
 Tomasz Mazurkiewicz
 Łukasz Nawotczyński
 Marcin Nowacki
 Euzebiusz Smolarek
 Michał Stasiak
 Mariusz Zganiacz
 Manuel Marani
 Stefan Ålander
 Bojan Djordjic
 Tobias Hysén
 Stefan Ishizaki
 Pablo Piñones-Arce
 Babis Stefanidis

External links
 Group 4 at UEFA.com

Group 4
International association football competitions hosted by Sweden
International association football competitions hosted by Hungary
International association football competitions hosted by Poland
International association football competitions hosted by Latvia
International association football competitions hosted by San Marino
2002 in Swedish football
2003 in Swedish football
Sports competitions in Sundsvall
Sports competitions in Västerås